is the first album by Japanese hard rock band Rider Chips, released on March 16, 2005. The catalogue code for this album is AVCA-22283.

Track listing 
 "ELEMENTS" feat. Ricky
 "The people with no name" feat. m.c.A.T
 "Sitting On The Dynamite" feat. Jin Hashimoto
 "We gotta fight" feat. Diamond Yukai
 "DEEP BREATH" feat. Rolly
  feat. Ricky
 "Gravitation" feat. Keiko Terada
  feat. Kenji Ohtsuki
  feat. m.c.A.T
 "Super Human" feat. Ricky
 "Hard knock life" feat. Diamond Yukai
  feat. Keiko Terada
 "Touch" feat. Rolly & Jin Hashimoto
 "The Last Card" feat. m.c.A.T
 "POWER CHILD" feat. Rolly

Personnel 
Yoshio Nomura – guitar
Koichi Terasawa – bass
Joe – drums
Ayumu Koshikawa (violin) – track 8
Cher Watanabe (keyboards) – tracks 1-4, 6-12 & 14
Diamond☆Yukai (vocals and blues harp) – tracks 4 & 11
Jin Hashimoto (vocals) – tracks 3 & 13
Keiko Terada (vocals) – tracks 7 & 12
Kenji Otsuki (vocals) – track 8
m.c.A・T (vocals) – tracks 2, 9 & 14
Muneyuki Kamimoto (keyboards) – track 15
Raida (chorus) – Shounen Shoujo Gassyoutai 
Ricky (vocals) – tracks 1, 6 & 10
Rolly (vocals) – tracks 5, 13 & 15
Yoshichika Inomata (keyboards) – tracks 5 & 13

External links 
Rider Chips official website 

2005 albums
Rider Chips albums